is a Japanese professional football player who plays as a centre-back for Hougang United.

Career

In 2015, he joined Omiya Ardija after completing his university.  

In 2020, he transferred to Montedio Yamagata on loan. 

On December 30, 2021, he completed his transfer to Kataller Toyama in J3.  

He moved to Hougang United in 2023.

Club statistics
Updated to 23 February 2020.

References

External links
Profile at Omiya Ardija

1996 births
Living people
Association football people from Saitama Prefecture
Japanese footballers
J1 League players
J2 League players
J3 League players
Omiya Ardija players
J.League U-22 Selection players
Montedio Yamagata players
Association football defenders